Jehoshaphat ben Saul (Hebrew: יהושפט בן שאול) was the son of Saul ben Anan and the grandson of Anan ben David. He lived in Iraq during the early ninth century. Jehoshaphat was nasi and resh galuta of the nascent Karaite movement of Judaism. He was the father of Boaz ben Jehoshaphat.

Karaite rabbis
Karaite exilarchs
9th-century people from the Abbasid Caliphate
9th-century rabbis
Jewish royalty